The 1958 Washington State Cougars football team was an American football team that represented Washington State College in the Pacific Coast Conference (PCC) during the 1958 NCAA University Division football season. In their third season under head coach Jim Sutherland, the Cougars compiled a  record and outscored their opponents 199 to 117. In the final year of the PCC, Washington State was 6–2 in league play, runner-up to California.

The Cougars' statistical leaders included Dave Wilson with 641 passing yards, Chuck Morrell with 571 rushing yards, and Gail Cogdill with 479 receiving yards.

Hopeful for a bowl game bid (Sugar, Gator), a waiver from the other PCC members was required, as the conference allowed only the Rose Bowl bid. USC and UCLA voted against it, ending the Cougars' season.

Schedule

Roster

NFL Draft
One Cougar was selected in the 1959 NFL Draft, which was thirty rounds (360 selections).

References

External links
 Game program: Stanford at WSC – September 20, 1958
 Game program: USC vs. WSC at Spokane – October 25, 1958
 Game program: Oregon State at WSC – November 8, 1958
 Game program: Washington vs. WSC at Spokane – November 22, 1958

Washington State
Washington State Cougars football seasons
Washington State Cougars football